The first Finnish presidential election was held in 1919 . Presidential elections have been held every 6 years thereafter.

Candidates